Lady A (formerly known as Lady Antebellum) are an American country music group composed of Hillary Scott, Charles Kelley and Dave Haywood. They have released nine studio albums (which includes one Christmas album), two extended plays, two box sets, and 23 singles, not counting guest appearances or digital-only releases. The lead singers are Charles Kelly and Hillary Scott. All ten of their full-length releases have debuted in the top ten on the Top Country Albums chart, including five number-ones. They have sold 10.2 million albums in the US as of February 2016.

The trio's debut album was released in 2008 via Capitol Records Nashville. It included the singles "Love Don't Live Here", "Lookin' for a Good Time" and "I Run to You", with the latter becoming the group's first number one on the US Billboard Hot Country Songs chart as well as the number one country music song of the year according to Billboard Year-End chart. It was followed by "Need You Now", the title track to the group's second album. This song reached number-one on the country, Adult Contemporary, and Adult Pop Songs charts, as well as number 2 on the Billboard Hot 100 and Canadian Hot 100. After it came the number-one country hits "American Honey" and "Our Kind of Love", followed by the top 10 "Hello World".

The band's third studio album, Own the Night, was released on September 13, 2011. Its first two singles, "Just a Kiss" and "We Owned the Night", both reached number one. Their fifth studio album, Golden, was released on May 7, 2013. 747, their sixth studio album, was released on September 30, 2014.

Albums

Studio albums

Christmas albums

Box sets

Extended plays

Singles

As lead artist

As featured artist

Promotional singles

Other charted songs

Other appearances

Videography

DVDs

Music videos

As featured artist

Notes

References

External links
Official website
[ Lady Antebellum overview] at AllMusic

Country music discographies
Discographies of American artists
Discography